The 1978 Boston University Terriers football team was an American football team that represented Boston University as a member of the Yankee Conference during the 1978 NCAA Division I-AA football season. In their second season under head coach Rick Taylor, the Terriers compiled a 6–4 record (2–3 against conference opponents), finished fourth in the conference, and were outscored by a total of 177 to 169.

Schedule

References

Boston University
Boston University Terriers football seasons
Boston University Terriers football